Judy Craig (born June 11, 1944, New York City) is the lead singer of the American girl group, The Chiffons. She left the group in 1969, but returned in 1992 after the death of Barbara Lee. Fronted by Judy Craig Mann along with her daughter and niece, The Chiffons resurfaced in 2009 and continue to tour and perform in North America and Europe.

Early life
Craig is a native of The Bronx.  She was a senior in high school when "He's So Fine" hit.  Craig attended James Monroe High School.

References

External links
Official website for Judy Craig Mann & The Chiffons

1946 births
Living people
Singers from New York City
People from the Bronx
James Monroe High School (New York City) alumni
21st-century African-American women singers
20th-century African-American women singers